The 1984 Tour of the Basque Country was the 24th edition of the Tour of the Basque Country cycle race and was held from 2 April to 6 April 1984. The race started in Mungia and finished at Zarautz. The race was won by Sean Kelly of the Skil team.

General classification

References

1984
Bas